Filatima lapidescens is a moth of the family Gelechiidae. It is found in Mexico (Sonora).

The wingspan is about 15 mm. The forewings are stone-grey, sparsely dusted with blackish atoms, especially along the margins and on the base of the pale stone-grey cilia, a very few ochreous scales lying along the middle of the fold. The veins beyond the cell are slightly indicated by darkened scaling. The hindwings are pale leaden grey, with a brownish tinge beyond the middle.

References

Moths described in 1916
Filatima